The Bârsău is a right tributary of the river Someș in Romania. It discharges into the Someș in Colțirea.

References

Rivers of Romania
Rivers of Maramureș County